Jens Petersen (22 December 1941 – 8 March 2012) was a Danish football player and manager. He was born in Esbjerg. During his playing career he played as a defender for Esbjerg fB and Varde IF in Denmark, Aberdeen in Scotland, SK Rapid Wien in Austria, and Racing Mechelen in Belgium.

He earned a total of 22 caps for the Danish national side, but his international career was ended when he turned professional and joined Aberdeen. After retiring as a player in 1975, he managed Varde IF and Esbjerg fB.

He died on 8 March 2012, aged 70.

References

External links
 Profile at Esbjerg fB
 Profile at rapidarchiv.at

1941 births
2012 deaths
People from Esbjerg
Danish men's footballers
Denmark international footballers
Danish football managers
SK Rapid Wien players
Aberdeen F.C. players
Esbjerg fB players
Expatriate footballers in Scotland
Scottish Football League players
Expatriate footballers in Austria
Expatriate footballers in Belgium
Danish expatriate men's footballers
Place of death missing
Association football defenders
Sportspeople from the Region of Southern Denmark